The Fifth Air Force (5 AF) is a numbered air force of the United States Air Force Pacific Air Forces (PACAF). It is headquartered at Yokota Air Base, Japan. It is the U.S. Air Force's oldest continuously serving Numbered Air Force. The organization has provided 80 years of continuous air power to the Pacific since its establishment in September 1941.

Fifth Air Force is the Headquarters Pacific Air Forces forward element in Japan, and maximizes partnership capabilities and promotes bilateral defense cooperation. In addition, 5 AF is the air component to United States Forces Japan.

Its mission is three-fold. First, it plans, conducts, controls, and coordinates air operations assigned by the PACAF Commander. Fifth Air Force maintains a level of readiness necessary for successful completion of directed military operations. And last, but certainly not least, Fifth Air Force assists in the mutual defense of Japan and enhances regional stability by planning, exercising, and executing joint air operations in partnership with Japan. To achieve this mission, Fifth Air Force maintains its deterrent force posture to protect both U.S. and Japanese interests, and conducts appropriate air operations should deterrence fail.

Fifth Air Force is commanded by Lieutenant General Ricky Rupp.

History

Fourteen Boeing B-17 Flying Fortresses that survived the Battle of the Philippines left Mindanao for Darwin, Australia, between 17 and 20 December 1941, the only aircraft of the Far East Air Force to escape. After its evacuation from the Philippines on 24 December 1941, FEAF headquarters moved to Australia and was reorganized and redesignated 5 Air Force on 5 February 1942, with most of its combat aircraft based on fields on Java.  It seemed at the time that the Japanese were advancing just about everywhere. The remaining heavy bombers of the 19th Bombardment Group, based at Malang on Java, flew missions against the Japanese in an attempt to stop their advance. They were joined in January and February, two or three at a time, by 37 B-17Es and 12 LB-30s of the 7th Bombardment Group. The small force of bombers, never numbering more than 20 operational at any time, could do little to prevent the invasion of the Netherlands East Indies, launching valiant but futile attacks against the masses of Japanese shipping, with six lost in combat, six in accidents, and 26 destroyed on the ground.

The 7th Bombardment Group was withdrawn to India in March 1942, leaving the 19th to carry on as the only B-17 Fortress-equipped group in the South Pacific.  About this time it was decided that replacement B-17s would not be sent to the southwest Pacific, but be sent exclusively to the Eighth Air Force which was building up in England.  By May, Fifth Air Force's surviving personnel and aircraft were detached to other commands and the headquarters remained unmanned for several months, but elements played a small part in the Battle of the Coral Sea (7–8 May 1942) when the 435th Bomb Squadron of the 19th Bomb Group saw the Japanese fleet gathering in Rabaul area nearly two weeks before the battle actually took place. Because of the reconnaissance activity of the 435th Bomb Squadron, the US Navy was prepared to cope adequately with the situation. The squadron was commended by the US Navy for its valuable assistance not only for its excellent reconnaissance work but for the part played in the battle.

Headquarters Fifth Air Force was re-staffed at Brisbane, Australia on 18 September 1942 and placed under the command of Major General George Kenney. United States Army Air Forces units in Australia, including Fifth Air Force, were eventually reinforced and re-organised following their initial defeats in the Philippines and the East Indies.  At the time that Kenney had arrived, Fifth Air Force was equipped with three fighter groups and five bombardment groups.

Fighter Groups:
 8th FG (P-39) Townsville, Australia
 35th FG (P-40) Port Moresby, New Guinea
 49th FG (P-40) Darwin, Australia

Bomber Groups:
 3rd BG (B-25, A-20, & A-24) Charters Towers, Australia
 19th BG (Non-Operational.  Battle scarred from Philippines & Java) Mareeba, Australia
 22nd BG (B-26) Woodstock, Australia
 38th BG (B-25) Charters Towers, Australia
 43rd BG (B-17 until 1943; B-24 1943–1945) Port Moresby, New Guinea

In addition, Fifth Air Force controlled two transport squadrons and one photographic squadron comprising 1,602 officers and 18,116 men.

Kenney was later appointed commander of Allied air forces in the South West Pacific Area, reporting directly to General Douglas MacArthur. Under Kenney's leadership, the Fifth Air Force and Royal Australian Air Force provided the aerial spearhead for MacArthur's island hopping campaign.

US Far East Air Forces 

On 4 November 1942, the Fifth Air Force commenced sustained action against the Japanese in Papua New Guinea and was a key component of the New Guinea campaign (1942–1945).  Fifth Air Force engaged the Japanese again in the Philippines campaign (1944–45) as well as in the Battle of Okinawa (1945).

Fifth Air Force along with Thirteenth Air Force in the Central Pacific and Seventh Air Force in Hawaii were assigned to the newly created United States Far East Air Forces (FEAF) on 3 August 1944. FEAF was subordinate to the U.S. Army Forces Far East and served as the headquarters of Allied Air Forces Southwest Pacific Area. By 1945, the three numbered air forces were supporting operations throughout the Pacific.  FEAF was the functional equivalent in the Pacific of the United States Strategic Air Forces (USSTAF) in the European Theater of Operations.

Order of battle, 1945 

LEGEND: ACG – Air Commando Group, FG – Fighter Group, NFS – Night Fighter Squadron, BG (L) – Light Bomb Group, BG (M) – Medium Bomb Group, BG (H) – Heavy Bomb Group, RG – Reconnaissance Group, CCG – Combat Cargo Group, TCG – Troop Carrier Group 

When the war ended, Fifth Air Force had an unmatched record of 3,445 aerial victories, led by the nation's two top fighter aces Major Richard Bong and Major Thomas McGuire, with 40 and 38 confirmed victories respectively, and two of Fifth Air Force's ten Medal of Honor recipients.

Shortly after World War II ended in August, Fifth Air Force relocated to Irumagawa Air Base, Japan, about 25 September 1945 as part of the Allied occupation forces.  The command remained in Japan until 1 December 1950 performing occupation duties.

Korean War
  for the units, stations and type aircraft flown in combat during the war (25 June 1950 – 27 July 1953)

In 1950, Fifth Air Force was called upon again, becoming the main United Nations Command combat air command during the Korean War, and assisted in bringing about the Korean Armistice Agreement that formally ended the war in 1953.

In the early morning hours of 25 June, North Korea launched a sudden, all-out attack against the south. Reacting quickly to the invasion, Fifth Air Force units provided air cover over the skies of Seoul. The command transferred to Seoul on 1 December 1950, remaining in South Korea until 1 September 1954.

In this first Jet War, units assigned to the Fifth Air Force racked up an unprecedented 14.5 to 1 victory ratio. By the time the truce was signed in 1953, Fifth Air Force had flown over 625,000 missions, downing 953 North Korean and Chinese aircraft, while close air support accounted for 47 percent of all enemy troop casualties.

Thirty-eight fighter pilots were identified as aces, including Lieutenant Colonel James Jabara, America's first jet ace; and Captain Joseph McConnell, the leading Korean War ace with 16 confirmed victories. Additionally, four Medals of Honor were awarded to Fifth Air Force members. One other pilot of note was Marine Major John Glenn, who flew for Fifth Air Force as part of an exchange program.

With the end of combat in Korea, Fifth Air Force returned to normal peacetime readiness Japan in 1954.

Cold War
Not only concerned with maintaining a strong tactical posture for the defense of both Japan and South Korea, Fifth Air Force played a critical role in helping the establishment of the Japan Air Self-Defense Force as well as the Republic of Korea Air Force. These and other peacetime efforts lasted a decade before war clouds once again developed in the Pacific.

This time, the area of concern was Southeast Asia, beginning in 1964 with the Gulf of Tonkin Crisis. Fifth Air Force furnished aircraft, aircrews, Support personnel, and supplies throughout the eight years of combat operations in South Vietnam and Laos.
Since 1972, the Pacific has seen relative calm, but that doesn't mean Fifth Air Force hasn't been active in other roles. The command has played active or supporting roles in a variety of issues ranging from being first on the scene at the Korean Air Lines Flight 007 shoot down in 1983 to deploying personnel and supplies for the Persian Gulf War in 1990.

During this time span, the size of Fifth Air Force changed as well. With the activation of Seventh Air Force in 1986, fifth left the Korean Peninsula and focused its energy on continuing the growing bilateral relationship with Japan.

The Fifth Air Force's efforts also go beyond combat operations. Fifth Air force has reacted to natural disasters in Japan and abroad. These efforts include the Great Hanshin earthquake in 1995 and Super Typhoon Paka which hit Guam in 1997. Fifth Air Force has reached out to provide assistance to victims of floods, typhoons, volcanoes, and earthquakes throughout the region.

The 432d Tactical Fighter Wing flew F-16s from Misawa Air Base from July 1, 1984 – October 31, 1994. On the inactivation of the wing, its personnel, aircraft, and other assets were used to reform the 35th Fighter Wing.

Present Day
Today, according to the organization's website, major components include the 18th Wing, Kadena Air Base, Okinawa Prefecture, Japan; the 35th Fighter Wing at Misawa Air Base, and the 374th Airlift Wing at Yokota Air Base. Kadena AB hosts the 18th Wing, the largest combat wing in the USAF. The Wing includes F-15 fighters, KC-135 refuelers, E-3 Airborne Warning and Control System aircraft, and HH-60G Pave Hawk rescue helicopters, and represents a major combat presence and capability in the Western Pacific. The 35th Fighter Wing, Misawa Air Base, Japan, includes two squadrons equipped with the most modern Block 50 F-16 variant, dedicated to the suppression of enemy air defenses. The final formation is the 374th Airlift Wing, at Yokota Air Base, Japan.

According to a 2017 study by two US Navy commanders, in case of a surprise Chinese ballistic missile attack against airbases in Japan, more than 200 U.S. aircraft would be trapped or destroyed on the ground in the first hours of the conflict.

Lineage, assignments, stations, and components

Lineage
 Established as Philippine Department Air Force on 16 August 1941
 Activated on 20 September 1941
 Redesignated: Far East Air Force on 16 November 1941
 Redesignated: 5 Air Force on 5 February 1942
 Redesignated: Fifth Air Force* on 18 September 1942.

Fifth Air Force is not to be confused with a second "Fifth" air force created as a temporary establishment to handle combat operations after the outbreak of hostilities on 25 June 1950, in Korea. This numbered air force was established as Fifth Air Force, Advance, and organized at Itazuki AB, Japan, assigned to Fifth Air Force, on 14 July 1950. It moved to Taegu AB, South Korea, on 24 July 1950, and was redesignated Fifth Air Force in Korea at the same time. After moving, it apparently received command control from U.S. Far East Air Forces. The establishment operated from Pusan, Taegu, and Seoul before being discontinued on 1 December 1950.

Assignments
 Philippine Department, U.S. Army, 20 September 1941
 US Forces in Australia (USFIA), 23 December 1941
 Redesignated:  US Army Forces in Australia (USAFIA), 5 January 1942
 American-British-Dutch-Australian Command (ABDACOM), 23 February 1942
 Allied Air Force, Southwest Pacific Area (SWPA), 2 November 1942
 Far East Air Forces (Provisional), 15 June 1944
 Far East Air Forces, 3 August 1944
 Redesignated: Pacific Air Command, United States Army, 6 December 1945
 Redesignated: Far East Air Forces, 1 January 1947
 Redesignated Pacific Air Forces, 1 July 1957—present

Stations

 Nichols Field, Luzon, 20 September 1941
 RAAF Base Darwin, Australia, 31 December 1941
 Bandoeng, Java, 18 January 1942
 Brisbane AAB, Australia,c 1 March 1942
 Nadzab Airfield, New Guinea, 15 June 1944
 Owi Airfield, Schouten Islands, Netherlands East Indies, 10 August 1944
 Bayug Airfield, Leyte, Philippines, c. 20 November 1944
 McGuire Field, Mindoro, Philippines, January 1945
 Clark Field, Luzon, Philippines, April 1945
 Hamasaki (Motobu Airfield), Okinawa, 4 August 1945

 Irumagawa AB, Japan, c. 25 September 1945
 Tokyo, Japan, 13 January 1946
 Nagoya, Japan, 20 May 1946
 Seoul AB (K-16), Korea, 1 December 1950
 Taegu AB (K-2), Korea, 22 December 1950
 Seoul AB (K-16), 15 June 1951
 Osan AB, Korea, 25 January 1954
 Nagoya AB (later, Nagoya AS; Moriyama AS), Japan, 1 September 1954
 Fuchu AS, Japan, 1 July 1957
 Yokota AB, Japan, 11 November 1974–present

Major components

Commands
 V Air Force Service: 18 June 1943 – 15 June 1944
 V Air Service Area: 9 January 1944 – 15 June 1944
 5 Bomber (later, V Bomber): 14 November 1941 – 31 May 1946
 V Fighter: 25 August 1942 – 31 May 1946
 5 Interceptor: 4 November 1941 – 6 April 1942
 Became Army Air Force Infantry unit during Battle of the Philippines (1941–42) (20 December 1941 – 9 April 1942)
 Far East Air Service (later, 5 Air Force Base; V Air Force Base): 28 October 1941 – 2 November 1942

Divisions
 39th Air Division: 1 September 1954 – 15 January 1968
 41st Air Division: 1 September 1954 – 15 January 1968
 43d Air Division: 1 September 1954 – 1 October 1957
 313th Air Division: 1 March 1955 – 1 October 1991
 314th Air Division: 31 May 1946 – 1 March 1950; 1 December 1950 – 18 May 1951; 15 March 1955 – 8 September 1986
 315 Air Division (formerly, 315 Composite Wing): 1 June 1946 – 1 March 1950.

Wings (incomplete listing)
 8th Fighter Wing, later 8th Tactical Fighter Wing, 1950s
 18th Wing: 1 Oct 1991-. 
 35th Fighter Wing: 1 Oct 1994-. 
 51st Fighter Wing: 1955-September 1986
 374th Airlift Wing: 1 Apr 1992-.
 432d Tactical Fighter Wing, Misawa Air Base, Japan: July 1, 1984 – May 31, 1991; 432d Fighter Wing from June 1, 1991 - October 31, 1994 (wing personnel and assets thereafter used to reactivate 35th Fighter Wing)
 6100th Support Wing, Tachikawa Air Base, Japan: "Brigadier General Thomas R. FORD Replaced Col. Lewis B. MENG as commander of 6100th Support Wing effective" 11 June 1962. "6100 Support Wing was Major Air Command control (MAJCON) unit directly subordinate to Headquarters (HQ) 5 Air Force. Contains.. functions of various subordinate elements of 6100 Support Wing (Kanto Base Command)."

Groups
2nd Combat Cargo Group: October 1944-15 January 1946

List of commanders

See also
 United States Army Air Forces in Australia

References

 Maurer, Maurer (1983). Air Force Combat Units of World War II. Maxwell AFB, Alabama: Office of Air Force History. .
 Ravenstein, Charles A. (1984). Air Force Combat Wings Lineage and Honors Histories 1947–1977. Maxwell AFB, Alabama: Office of Air Force History. ..

Bibliography

 Bartsch, William H. Doomed at the Start: American Pursuit Pilots in the Philippines, 1941–1942. Reveille Books, 1995.  .
 Birdsall, Steve. Flying Buccaneers: The Illustrated History of Kenney's Fifth Air Force. New York: Doubleday & Company, 1977. .
 Craven, Wesley F. and James L. Cate. The Army Air Forces in World War II. Chicago: University of Chicago Press, 1948–58.
 Holmes, Tony. "Twelve to One": V Fighter Command Aces of the Pacific. Botley, Oxford, UK: Osprey Publishing, 2004. .
 Rust, Kenn C. Fifth Air Force Story...in World War II. Temple City, California: Historical Aviation Album, 1973. .

External links

 Fifth Air Force Factsheet
 Red Raiders—22nd Bomb Group, 5th Air Force, WW II
 38th Bomb Group Association
 43rd Bomb Group Association: Ken's Men
 The Julius Schellenberg Collection at the Leo Baeck Institute, New York includes the diary of 5th Air Force sergeant Julius Schellenberg from February – December 1942 and a photograph of the 5th Air Force in 1942.

05
05
United States Air Force units and formations in the Korean War
United States military in Japan
World War II aerial operations and battles of the Pacific theatre